Lewisia cantelovii is an uncommon species of flowering plant in the family Montiaceae known by the common name Cantelow's lewisia. It is endemic to California, where it is known from the northeastern mountain ranges from the Klamath Mountains to the northern Sierra Nevada. It grows in rocky, moist mountain habitat. This is a perennial herb growing from a short, thick taproot and caudex unit. It produces a basal rosette of thick, fleshy, blunt-tipped spoon-shaped leaves with serrated edges. The inflorescence is a very slender erect stem up to 45 centimeters tall topped with a spreading panicle of flowers and glandular, toothed bracts. Each flower has 5 to 7 oval petals each one half to one centimeter long. The petals are white or very pale pink with sharp dark pink veins. At the center of the flower are five stamens tipped with dark pink anthers.

External links
Jepson Manual Treatment
Photo gallery

cantelovii
Endemic flora of California
Flora of the Cascade Range
Flora of the Klamath Mountains
Flora of the Sierra Nevada (United States)
Flora without expected TNC conservation status